Famatina is an Argentinian Department in La Rioja Province.

Geography 
The department borders Catamarca Province to the north, San Blas de los Sauces Department, Castro Barros Department and Sanagasta Department to the east, Chilecito Department to the south, Vinchina Department to the west and General Lamadrid Department to the southwest.

Population 
According to estimates for June 2007, the population was 6819 inhabitants.

Department Localities 
 Famatina
 Alto Carrizal
 Ángulos
 Antinaco
 Bajo Carrizal
 Campanas
 Chañarmuyo
 La Cuadra
 Pituil
 Plaza Vieja
 Santa Cruz
 Santo Domingo

Flora & fauna 

Endemic Famatina animals are: birds Upucerthia validirostris rufescens, Upucerthia ruficauda famatinae, Cinclodes fuscus riojanus, Asthenes modesta serrana, lizard Liolaemus famatinae (near extinction), Phymaturus mallimacci (near extinction); mammals  Abrocoma famatina (near extinction) and Lagidium viscacia famatinae.

There are populations of threatened species of the Andes region (Taruca Hippocamelus antisensis (a deer species), Vultur gryphus and Rhea pennata.

Endemic plants include Baccharis famatinensis.

Serranías del Famatina Provincial Wildlife Reserve
The Reserve was decreed in 2002 by provincial law 7292. However, that reserve was never implemented.

References 

Departments of La Rioja Province, Argentina